João Gilberto Prado Pereira de Oliveira was released in 1980 by João Gilberto. It was recorded in 1980 live on TV Globo. In English, that would be his entire Brazilian ancestral last name written on his studio album.

Track listing

"Chega de Saudade" was performed with Bebel Gilberto and "Jou Jou e Balangandans" was performed with Rita Lee.

Personnel 
 Guitar/Vocals - João Gilberto
 Singer - Bebel Gilberto
 Singer - Rita Lee

Sources 

Gridley, Mark. Jazz Styles: History and Analysis. 9th. NJ: Pearson Prentice Hall, Print.

João Gilberto albums
1980 albums
Warner Music Group albums